Greenfield Park Primary International School is an elementary school located in Greenfield Park, Quebec, Canada. It is a bilingual institution operated by the Riverside School Board and the Commission Scolaire Marie-Victorin. The school has been certified by the International Baccalaureate Organization since 2002.

The building itself, located on Campbell street in Greenfield Park used to be called Jubilee since its opening in 1957 until its closure in June 1998. The school re-opened in September 1998 as the "International School", under the Commission Scolaire Marie Victorin.

Asbestos problem
In December 2007, asbestos dust was found in the air.  Some areas of the school were cordoned off in order to treat this problem.

References

Educational institutions established in 1998
International Baccalaureate schools in Quebec
Riverside School Board
Elementary schools in Longueuil
1998 establishments in Quebec